Richard Speight Jr. (born September 4, 1969) is an American actor and director who is known for a variety of roles including CBS TV series Jericho, The Agency, and the HBO miniseries Band of Brothers. Speight played a recurring role, the Archangel Gabriel, originally thought to be a "Trickster" or Loki, in the WB/CW series Supernatural. More recently, he played Dugan in the 2021 film Old Henry.

Personal life
Speight was raised in Nashville, Tennessee, the son of Barbara and Richard Speight Sr. He has two older sisters. Speight attended Montgomery Bell Academy and the USC School of Dramatic Arts (formerly the USC School of Theatre), graduating cum laude. While at USC, he met and befriended writer and director Stephen Chbosky. Speight appeared in Chbosky's senior showcase piece. Years later, the two teamed up on the CBS series Jericho which Chbosky co-created.

In 2003, Speight married Jaci Kathryn Hays, a dot-com executive in California.

Career

Television
Speight has starred in a variety of commercials for such brands as Got Milk?; IBM; Pepsi; and Disney.

Speight played Sgt. Warren "Skip" Muck in the Golden Globe and Emmy Award-winning World War II miniseries Band of Brothers, produced for HBO by Tom Hanks and Steven Spielberg. Speight appeared in several television series, such as The Agency; ER; Jericho; Party of Five and JAG.

In 2007, he landed a recurring role on "the now longest-running sci-fi series in the history of American broadcast television" Supernatural where he played 'The Trickster/Loki' (later revealed to be the Archangel Gabriel). Making a surprise return in 2018, Speight's characters returned to the screens as dual roles of Gabriel and Loki in Season 13 episode "Unfinished Business", while simultaneously directing the episode himself.

He had a recurring role on Justified, and guest starred on shows such as Life, Memphis Beat, Longmire, CSI: Crime Scene Investigation (2014), Criminal Minds: Beyond Borders (2017).

Film
Speight's earlier work included a role in the film, Ernest Goes to Camp; and a regular role on the NBC Saturday morning sitcom, Running the Halls. He had a brief appearance in the film, Thank You for Smoking, directed and written by fellow USC alumnus Jason Reitman. Speight appeared in Speed 2: Cruise Control and The Last Big Attraction. He had a starring role in Jason Reitman's short film, In God We Trust. Although credited on IMDb, Speight does not appear in the film Independence Day.

His more recent productions include La Musica Provata, The Week (2016), Mucho Dinero, Brick Madness, Bad, Bad Men, and Death House (2016). Lead roles include an FBI agent in a thriller, The Evil Gene (2016), and in a feature-length comedy thriller Driven (2019).

Web series
Speight is a close friend of actor Rob Benedict. The two often appear at conventions in tandem. Together, they created the comedy web-series Kings of Con (2016) based on their experiences at conventions for Supernatural, a TV show in which they both were featured actors and beloved characters. Speight is co-writer, producer, director, and actor in Kings of Con, and plays a "heightened version of himself" as character Richard Slate. With the support of a successful  Indiegogo campaign, the series launched on November 15, 2016 at Comic Con Headquarters in the U.S., and internationally through multiple platforms. An after show called Kings of Conversation is available on their Facebook page.

Directing and writing
Speight's directing career began with co-directing/co-starring in the independent feature North Beach (2004). A copy of this work is being preserved as part of SF History section at San Francisco Public Library - Main Branch. 

In 2013, Speight wrote and directed the satirical social comedy America 101. The festival darling and award-winning 10-minute short stars Band of Brothers veteran, Rick Gomez; co-stars Amy Gumenick, and North Beach alumni Jayden Lund and Jim Hanna. Now available on iTunes, the short feature is described as "One man's life becomes the lesson of the day when he takes a frenetic ride through his own personal version of the American experience.".

Success of America 101 launched Speight into the world of commercial directing. He has helmed several spots for Pepsi among other major national brands. 

Following his success in commercial directing and rigorous preparation in Warner Bros. TV Director's Workshop, Speight made his debut as TV show director on Supernatural's season 11 episode "Just My Imagination" – the first episode to have been nominated for Hugo Awards 2016 in the show's 15-year history. In season 13 episode "Unfinished Business", Speight masterfully both acted and directed himself in the dual characters of Gabriel and Loki. He continued to direct a few episodes each season throughout 11-15, achieving total of eleven episodes by the show's end in Spring 2020. Speight is the Top "8th" Director of Supernatural by Episode Count 

Speight's TV directing career continues to evolve with Netflix's Lucifer, CW's Kung Fu, and Walker (TV series).

Podcast 
Speight has participated in several celebrity podcasts including Thrilling Adventure Hour (Episodes 148, 159, 165, 171, 195, 196) and Michael Rosenbaum's Inside of You (2018).

Since the beginning of 2020 Coronavirus Pandemic, Benedict and Speight have teamed up again to brighten their communities with their own podcast series ...And My Guest Is Richard Speight, each offering original perspectives of COVID-19 life in lockdown. It has since evolved into Kings of Con: The Podcast, a much anticipated revival of the Speight-Benedict brand.

Continuing the legacy of Supernatural, the two host a weekly podcast Supernatural: Then and Now (2022), revisiting every episode along with the show's cast & crew as guests.

Music & music videos 
As a talented musician and performer, Speight has been a part of the music industry both on and off screen. A guitar and bass player with over two decades of experience, Speight's music career has been a colorful collaboration with many gifted artists.

As musician, Speight has been in several bands. Speight got his first recording under the belt as a cover band in high school called The Distortion Hawgs (1986), where he performed lead vocals & bass. Another notable participation at the start of his career was as the guitarist of the band Fugitive Pope (1993).   During college years, he was in the band Strange Neighbors (1989) with actor/harmonica player Tim Omundson. 

Speight participates as a guest singer on several albums by singer songwriter & producer Jason Manns – Christmas with Friends (2014), Covers with Friends (2016), and Recovering with Friends (2018). Highest ranking of collaborations with Jason include Chart Debut at #16 on iTunes for Covers with Friends   and peaked #12 for Recovering with Friends on Billboard Chart.  Speight released debut album as a Country band "Dick Jr. & The Volunteers" called The Dance and How To Do It (2019) produced by Jason Manns.

Speight is a beloved guest performer at Saturday Night Special concerts by the indie rock band Louden Swain, held all over North America averaging a dozen shows a year. Along with the cast of Supernatural, a live recording album of the same name was released by Louden Swain in 2017. The album made several music charts - Billboard chart  peaked at #1 on Heatseekers West North Central, #13 on Heatseekers, and #40 on Independent Albums, and  iTunes highest ranking at #78 in the U.S. ; He is also a contributor to album Sky Alive by the same band.   
  
As actor, he has been featured in music video for two of Slayer's trilogy You Against You and Pride in Prejudice, showcasing his strength in acting for horror genre 

As director, Speight completed his first music video for Louden Swain's rock song called Bandaged Hand using only an iPhone and spare few hours during his convention tours.   As a director, Speight oversees the entire creative process including Sound & Music department for films and television.

Conventions
While he only appeared in five episodes of Supernatural between 2007-2014, both Speight's on-screen and off-screen character became very much beloved by fans, which enabled him to stay in close contact with the current cast and crew through his steady contributions at fan conventions (including San Diego Comic-Con, New York Comic-Con and several in Europe, Brazil, Australia). As of May 2016, he has participated in over 70 fan conventions.

His most notable contribution to the convention world is at the "Salute To Supernatural", held annually in many cities across North America. Making appearances since 2008, Speight's charmingly quick wit and on-stage chemistry with fellow performers have enabled the convention to grow over the years as he became the Master of Ceremonies in 2013 – hosting for the entire three days of convention weekend, 13 weekends a year.

Along with Matt Cohen, Speight became known as the Karaoke Kings as founders of an accessible karaoke event for all, which started with fewer than 10 attendees and has grown to crowds of thousands. Speight also participates in Saturday Night Special concert with the band Louden Swain as a singer and bass player.

Filmography

Film

Television

Music videos

As a director

References

External links

Richard Speight Jr. on Facebook

1969 births
American male film actors
American male television actors
Living people
People from Nashville, Tennessee
Male actors from Nashville, Tennessee
USC School of Dramatic Arts alumni
20th-century American male actors
21st-century American male actors